David Chudnovsky may refer to:

 David Chudnovsky (mathematician) (born 1947), American mathematician
 David Chudnovsky (politician) (born 1949), Canadian politician